Redshark is a Spanish heavy metal band, founded in 2012 in Barcelona. The band is often referred to as the NWOTHM movement.

History

Musical style
Redshark's musical style has been described as heavy metal, power metal, NWOTHM, and, especially often, speed metal. In an interview, their vocalist Philip Graves stated:

Discography
 2016 - Rain of Destruciton (EP)
 2019 - Evil Realm (EP)
 2022 - Digital Race (LP)

Members

Current
 Philip Graves - Vocals, bass, guitar (2012–Present)
 Javier Bono - Guitar (2012–present) 
 Chris Carrest - Bass (2016–Present)
 Pau Correas Corretja - Vocals (2019–Present)
 Eric Martinez (aka Killer Lethal) - Drums (2022–Present)

Former
 Mark Striker - Drums (2012–2022),

References

External links

Spanish heavy metal musical groups
Spanish power metal musical groups
Speed metal musical groups